La constitución (English title:The Constitution) is a Mexican telenovela produced by Televisa and transmitted by Telesistema Mexicano in 1970.

Cast 
María Félix as Guadalupe Arredondo
Sonia Amelio
Carlos Bracho
Narciso Busquets
Sergio Bustamante
Miguel Córcega
Carmen Montejo as Delfina Camacho
Beatriz Sheridan as Carmen Serdán
María Rubio
Pilar Pellicer
José Carlos Ruiz as Jovito

References

External links 

Mexican telenovelas
1970 telenovelas
Televisa telenovelas
Spanish-language telenovelas
1970 Mexican television series debuts
1970 Mexican television series endings